Burnham is a village in Cook County, Illinois, United States. The population was 4,046 at the 2020 census. The ZIP code is 60633.

Burnham has a Chicago ZIP code, and is often mistakenly considered part of Chicago. It is, however, an independent municipality lying just south of the Chicago city limits.

Burnham was named for Telford Burnham who drew its plat; not, as is widely assumed, by Chicago city planner and architect Daniel Burnham.

There are two sections of Burnham. The westernmost section surrounds Torrence Avenue, a north–south street. Torrence Avenue leaves this part of Burnham via a bridge, with Chicago on the other side. The eastern section surrounds Burnham Avenue, another north–south street. This section of Burnham ends at Brainard Avenue, where the Hegewisch neighborhood of Chicago lies on the other side. Upon entering Chicago, Burnham Avenue becomes Avenue O.

Geography 
Burnham is located at  (41.635535, -87.551284).

Surrounding areas 
Burnham is bordered by Chicago to the north, Calumet City to the south and west, and Hammond, Indiana, to the east.
 Chicago
 Chicago    Hammond, Indiana
 Calumet City   Hammond, Indiana
 Calumet City    Hammond, Indiana
 Calumet City

Demographics 
As of the 2020 census there were 4,046 people, 1,607 households, and 821 families residing in the village. The racial makeup of the village was 60.43% African American, 16.58% White, 0.59% Native American, 0.30% Asian, 12.75% from other races, and 9.34% from two or more races. Hispanic or Latino of any race were 25.58% of the population.

There were 1,607 households, out of which 56.57% had children under the age of 18 living with them, 22.78% were married couples living together, 23.15% had a female householder with no husband present, and 48.91% were non-families. 46.36% of all households were made up of individuals, and 11.82% had someone living alone who was 65 years of age or older. The average household size was 3.56 and the average family size was 2.40.

The village's age distribution consisted of 23.9% under the age of 18, 5.9% from 18 to 24, 28.7% from 25 to 44, 27.7% from 45 to 64, and 13.9% who were 65 years of age or older. The median age was 38.1 years. For every 100 females, there were 101.0 males. For every 100 females age 18 and over, there were 80.0 males.

The median income for a household in the village was $46,382, and the median income for a family was $46,890. Males had a median income of $54,931 versus $27,141 for females. The per capita income for the village was $24,430. About 15.3% of families and 15.4% of the population were below the poverty line, including 16.8% of those under age 18 and 15.3% of those age 65 or over.

Note: the US Census treats Hispanic/Latino as an ethnic category. This table excludes Latinos from the racial categories and assigns them to a separate category. Hispanics/Latinos can be of any race.

Government 
Burnham is in Illinois's 2nd congressional district.

Notable people 

 Mary Matalin, political consultant and author

References

External links 
 Village of Burnham official website

Villages in Illinois
Chicago metropolitan area
Villages in Cook County, Illinois
Populated places established in 1907
1907 establishments in Illinois
Majority-minority cities and towns in Cook County, Illinois